Jurgen Lentink is a Dutch Paralympic swimmer. In 1996, he won the bronze medals in the men's 100 m backstroke B3 and men's 100 m breaststroke B3 events.

References

External links
 

Living people
Year of birth missing (living people)
Place of birth missing (living people)
Swimmers at the 1996 Summer Paralympics
Swimmers at the 2000 Summer Paralympics
Medalists at the 2000 Summer Paralympics
Paralympic bronze medalists for the Netherlands
Paralympic medalists in swimming
Paralympic swimmers of the Netherlands
Dutch male breaststroke swimmers
Dutch male backstroke swimmers
S13-classified Paralympic swimmers
20th-century Dutch people
21st-century Dutch people